Tolmie is a town in central Victoria, Australia.

The Post Office opened on 1 February 1877 as Wombat, was renamed Tolmie in 1879, and closed in 1971 .

The town is named after Ewen Tolmie who was born in Scotland in 1816 and died at his homestead, Dueran, in 1883. The town has a few amenities such as the Tolmie Tavern and Hotel, which serves food and drinks as well as providing lodgings for visitors. The Tolmie Tavern is a great place to stop for a refreshing cold drink and offers a Tapas style menu. 

The Tolmie Community Social Club was started during the Covid crisis as an outdoor socially distanced family-friendly environment where the locals could meet for a drink, some live music and have a bite to eat on the weekend. The Social Club meets at the Tolmie Recreation Reserve at 13 Tolmie Mahaikah Road (and in the camp kitchen during Winter) Thursdays from 5.00 pm to 9.00 pm and Sundays from 4.00 pm to 8.00 pm. Sunday evening a meal is served for purchase. By 2023, with over 500 members, the club has built club rooms with bar. The social club welcomes new members. 

There used to be a general store and petrol station, but it has closed. The region surrounding the town is heavily forested, and much of it was devastated during the bushfires in 2006/07.

Each year the town holds an annual community event in February or March, at the known as Tolmie Recreation Reserve. The day includes foot races and novelty events, a dog jump, woodchopping and horse events, as well as raffles, many displays and an evening bush dance. The event typically attracts several thousand visitors. In 2023, the date for the 136th Tolmie Sports day is 4th March.

Climate

Located in the hills of Central Victoria, Tolmie is frequently affected by heavy snow and chilling rains throughout much of the year. Tolmie is one of the coldest localities by mean maximum temperature in mainland Australia, second only to Aberfeldy. It is the wettest locality in Victoria, and possibly also the wettest anywhere in mainland Australia's temperate zone (i.e., south of the 35th parallel until the Bass Strait).

References

External links
Geoscience Australia Place names search: Tolmie
Tolmie Sports
Rural City of Mansfield

Towns in Victoria (Australia)
Shire of Mansfield
Rural City of Wangaratta
Rural City of Benalla